Primera División Amateur is the third division of the Asociación Uruguaya de Fútbol league system. The league is sometimes referred to as Segunda B Nacional or La C.

List of champions

Tournament names:
 2017–2018: Segunda División B Nacional
 2019–present: Primera División Amateur

Titles by club

References

External links
 Segunda División Amateur Official Website (Spanish)
 Official Web

3
Sports leagues established in 2017
2017 establishments in Uruguay
Uru